Three Williams was launched in Holland in 1786, probably under another name. The British captured her in 1796. Thereafter she was a merchantman, primarily a West Indiaman, until 1804 when she made the first of two voyages as a slave ship in the triangular trade in enslaved people. After she delivered slaves to Jamaica on her second such voyage, she disappeared from records. and her fate is currently obscure.

Career
Three Williams first appeared in Lloyd's Register (LR) in 1797.

There was a report in early 1802 that Three Brothers had run down and sunk Three Williams on 6 March near Rathlin Island while Three Williams was on her way to Demerara from London. However, Three Williams put into Campbeltown having sustained slight damage, and that more from weather than any collision. 

1st slave voyage (1804–1805): Captain John Smith, Jr., acquired a letter of marque on 16 April 1804. He sailed from Liverpool on 5 May. Three Williams stopped at Demerara and then sailed for Jamaica on 25 January 1805. She arrived at Kingston on 10 February 1805 with 261 slaves. She arrived back at Liverpool on 14 October. She had brought back a cargo of sugar, coffee, rum, hides, cotton, ginger, tortoise shell, wine, and 74 logs of barwood.

2nd slave voyage (1807): Captain McClune sailed from Liverpool on 23 March 1807. He started acquiring slaves on 12 June, first at Anomabu, and then at Cape Coast Castle. On 12 July Three Williams was at Cape Coast, on her way to "Langos". On 8 December she arrived at Kingston with 185 slaves.

Fate
Although Lloyd's Register and the Register of Shipping continued to carry Three Williams for many more years after 1807, the data was stale. She did not appear in Lloyd's Lists or other newspapers' ship arrival and departure notices. It is currently unclear what became of her after she arrived at Kingston.

The Slave Trade Act 1807 had ended British participation in the trans-Atlantic slave trade; no British vessels could initiate a slave trading voyage after 1 May 1807. Three Williams may therefore have been sold, with new owners renaming her.

Citations

1786 ships
Ships built in the Netherlands
Captured ships
Age of Sail merchant ships of England
London slave ships